The 1962 United States Senate election in Arizona took place on November 6, 1962. Incumbent Democratic U.S. Senator Carl Hayden ran for reelection to a seventh term, defeating Republican State Senator Evan Mecham in the general election. Mecham became Governor of Arizona more than two decades later, and was subsequently impeached and removed from office.

This would be Hayden's final run for U.S. Senate, as he would be succeeded in office by Barry Goldwater in 1968. This would be the last time Democrats won the Class 3 Senate seat from Arizona until Mark Kelly's victory in the 2020 special election, and the last time until 2022, when Kelly was reelected, that Democrats won a full term in this seat.

Democratic primary

Candidates
 Carl T. Hayden, incumbent U.S. Senator
 W. Lee McLane

Results

Republican primary
State Senator Evan Mecham ran for U.S. Senate, and was challenged by political operative and strategist Stephen Shadegg. Shadegg, who had served as campaign manager for both Republican and Democratic candidates, had run at the urging of Senator Barry Goldwater, but Goldwater failed to officially endorse any candidate in the Republican primary. Shadegg later said that he was "terribly let down" by Goldwater's position of neutrality in the primary after Goldwater had urged Shadegg to seek the seat.

Candidates
 Evan Mecham, State Senator
 Stephen Shadegg, political strategist

Results

General election

See also 
 1962 United States Senate elections

References

1962
Arizona
United States Senate